Vladislav Delay is the most frequently used pseudonym of Sasu Ripatti (born 1976), a Finnish electronic musician. He has also recorded as Luomo, Sistol, Uusitalo, Conoco, and Ripatti, working in styles such as minimal techno, glitch, and house.

Background
Ripatti has been involved in the ambient music, glitch, house, and techno genres. His method of track production involves a mixture of synthesizing, vocal recording and live reprocessing. Many tracks have an organic feeling, conjured through rolling, dubby basslines and processed vocal snippets, often from his wife Antye Greie aka AGF. Their daughter was born in 2006.

Ripatti has released EPs and albums on numerous underground electronic labels, including Raster-Noton, Force Tracks, Chain Reaction, Mille Plateaux, Resopal, and Sigma Editions. He also founded the Finnish music label Huume Recordings and currently runs a label called Ripatti, on which he has released the album Visa and several footwork-oriented singles under the name Ripatti.

Ripatti played drums and percussion in the Moritz von Oswald Trio alongside Moritz von Oswald and Max Loderbauer from 2009 until 2015, when he was replaced by Tony Allen. With the Moritz von Oswald Trio he has released two albums and a live LP. He has also released an album in 2011 with his own experimental jazz/electronic group, the Vladislav Delay Quartet.

He performed as Vladislav Delay at an All Tomorrow's Parties festival in May 2011 curated by Animal Collective, who have praised his album Multila and whose member, Panda Bear, thanked his Luomo alias in the liner notes of his techno-inspired album Person Pitch.

Musical style
Ripatti's music is renowned for its sophisticated textural qualities. His sonic approach relies heavily on a semi-random element, and many undulating, complementary and sometimes conflicting layers interplay throughout most of his music. A de-constructive element is sometimes detected within the music as Ripatti makes comment on established genres within his various releases.

Characteristic traits within Ripatti's music are sometimes a deep or bubbling synth-bass line, fractured and syncopated percussion - often placed freely within the music, long delay repetitions of various sounds, syncopated use of vocal samples, and complicated digital effect processing techniques. Generally, the music has a very spacious and organic sound, and albums such as "Anima" feature a very simple theme repeated with an array of musical and rhythmical interjections.

Ripatti releases under different names have conceptually varied, but have sonically related qualities; this may be due to Ripatti's different composition techniques. Uusitalo releases are often anchored by a house beat and highlight rhythmic variation (see 2007's Karhunainen). Vladislav Delay releases, on the other hand (see 2000's Multila), explore rhythmically sparse, experimental and ambient techno-dub soundscapes. Works under the Luomo name feature dance-floor ready vocal house. Sistol performs microhouse; Conoco (under which he was only released one early EP, Kemikoski) is similar to his Vladislav Delay work but harsher and more industrial. His Ripatti releases are (a pastiche of) Chicago footwork.

Sasu Ripatti often references himself within his music. The "Vapaa Muurari" album, for example, provided much of the instrumental material for Vocalcity. Similarly, the track "Tessio" on the "Vocalcity" album was re-recorded for the "Present Lover" album in 2003.

Discography

Albums

As Vladislav Delay
Ele (1999)
Entain (2000)
Multila (2000) (re-released 2007 and 2020)
Anima (2001) (remastered and expanded 2008)
Naima (2002)
Demo(n) Tracks (2004)
The Four Quarters (2005)
Whistleblower (2007)
Tummaa (2009)
Vantaa (2011)
Kuopio (2012)
Visa (2014)
Untitled - Circa 2014 (2018)
Rakka (2020)
Rakka II (2021)

With Vladislav Delay Quartet
Vladislav Delay Quartet (2011)

As Sistol
Sistol (1999)
On the Bright Side (2010)

As Uusitalo
Vapaa Muurari (2000)
Tulenkantaja (2006)
Karhunainen (2007)

As Luomo
Vocalcity (2000)
The Present Lover (2003)
The Kick (2004), with Domenico Ferrari
Paper Tigers (2006)
Convivial (2008)
Plus (2011)

As Ripatti
Fun Is Not a Straight Line (2021)

As AGF/Delay
Explode (2005), with Antye Greie
Symptoms (2009), with Antye Greie

As The Dolls
The Dolls (2005) with Antye Greie and Craig Armstrong

With Moritz von Oswald Trio
Vertical Ascent (2009)
Live In New York (2010)
Horizontal Structures (2011)
Fetch (2012)

Singles
The Kind of Blue EP (1997)
Huone (1999)
Helsinki/Suomi (1999)
Ranta (2000)
Kemikoski (2000), as Conoco
Livingston (2000), as Luomo
Native (2000), as Luomo
Carter (2001), as Luomo
Tessio (Remixes) (2001), as Luomo
Diskonize Me (2002), as Luomo
Tessio (2003), as Luomo
Waltz For Your Eyes (2003), as Luomo
Running Away (2003), as Luomo, with Raz Ohara
Demo(n) Cuts EP (2004)
What's Good (2004), as Luomo
The Kick (2004), as Luomo, with Domenico Ferrari
Really Don't Mind (2006), as Luomo
Love You All (2008), as Luomo feat. Apparat
Tessio Remixes (2009), as Luomo
Symptoms (2009), as AGF/Delay, with Antye Greie
Restructure 2 (2010), as Moritz Von Oswald Trio, remixed by Digital Mystikz
Latoma EP (2011)
Espoo EP (2012)
Ripatti 01 (2014), as Ripatti

Work

Television

Arctic Circle (2014–present)

References

Further reading 
 2020 interview with Data.Wave magazine.

External links

Official website for works as Luomo
Label by Sasu Ripatti

1976 births
Living people
Finnish electronic musicians
People from Oulu